Kattak (ਕੱਤਕ) is the eighth month of the Nanakshahi calendar. This month coincides with Kartik in the Hindu calendar and the Indian national calendar, and October and November in the Gregorian and Julian calendars and is 30 days long.

Important events during this month

October
October 15 (1 Kattak) - The start of the month Katak
October 20 (6 Kattak) - Joti Jot of Guru Har Rai Ji 
October 20 (6 Kattak) - Gur Gadi of the Sri Guru Granth Sahib Ji
October 20 (6 Kattak) - Gur Gadi of Guru Har Krishan Ji
October 21 (7 Kattak) - Joti Jot of Guru Gobind Singh Ji

November
Diwali 
November 14 (1 Magghar) - The end of the month Katak and the start of Maghar

See also
Punjabi calendar

External links
www.srigranth.org SGGS Page 133
www.sikhcoalition.org

Months of the Nanakshahi calendar
Sikh terminology